The United States women's national futsal team represents the United States in international competitions. It is not operated by the United States Soccer Federation.

History
The national team participates in friendly matches and international futsal competitions, having reached the quarter-finals of the 2017 AMF Futsal Women's World Cup after previously finishing in the group stage of the 2013 edition.

See also
United States Futsal Federation
Futsal in the United States
United States national futsal team

References

USA women
Women
W
North American women's national futsal teams